Kenneth Ryan Anthony (born November 29, 1977) better known by his stage name R. Prophet, is an American rapper. He was formerly in the Kentucky-based sextet alternative southern rap group Nappy Roots. He attended Western Kentucky University with the present Nappy Roots members.

Early career
R. Prophet, born Kenneth Ryan Anthony, is an Oakland, California native and relocated to Louisville, Kentucky in 1985.  Anthony later pursued acting and theatre by attending duPont Manual High School's Youth Performing Arts School, one of only two programs in Kentucky allowing high school students to major in performing arts. Anthony excelled quickly starring in several plays, commercials, and short films. After graduating from high school, Anthony went on to attend Western Kentucky University where he would later start his music career.

Music career

1997–99: Career beginnings
In 1997, while attending Western Kentucky University, R. Prophet joined Skinny DeVille, B. Stille, Ron Clutch, Big V and Fish Scales to complete Nappy Roots, an American alternative Southern rap group. Nappy Roots began recording at ET's Music, a record store/studio. They released a full-length debut titled "Country Fried Cess" in 1998. This independent effort caught the attention of several major labels, and the group later signed to Atlantic Records in 1999.

2000–02: Watermelon, Chicken & Gritz
The group's first album released on Atlantic was 2002's best selling hip-hop album, "Watermelon, Chicken & Gritz". The multi-platinum album included the platinum hits "Headz Up", "Awnaw" and two time Grammy nominated "Po' Folks" featuring Anthony Hamilton. The song's signature concept, verse, and chorus was written by R. Prophet a prolific member of Nappy Roots. Discussing the meaning of "Po' Folks," R. Prophet told MTV.com that the lyrics did not only speak of being poor as an economic issue. "It's a state of mind. It's not so bad being poor when you've got your family and God in your life and you have different values that, when it comes down to it, matter. A lot of other things really don't matter when God is knocking at your door." Po' Folks later went on to be awarded a BMI publishing award in 2002.

2003–04
In 2003, R. Prophet and the group garnered several award nominations, including American Music Award nominations for Favorite New Artist and Favorite Band, Duo or Group in the Hip-Hop/R&B category. Nappy Roots was also nominated for Grammy awards for Best Rap/Sung Collaboration for "Po' Folks" and Grammy Award for Best Long Form Music Video for their DVD "The World According to Nappy."

Also in 2003, R. Prophet was among a group of celebrities and professional athletes who participated in USO Project Salute 2003, a tour that made stops throughout the Persian Gulf including Iraq. "This was an experience of a lifetime, being in an actual war zone, it's something I will never forget", remembers R. Prophet, of the USO tour. Nappy Roots was among the top groups requested to be a part of USO tour. Soon after, their third album Wooden Leather followed in the latter part of 2003, which featured the hit song "Round the Globe" and featured production from Kanye West, David Banner, and Lil Jon. In 2004, R. Prophet worked with his group on the three songs for the soundtrack of the film The Ladykillers by Joel Coen and Ethan Coen.

2005–06
In 2005–06, R. Prophet was involved in numerous community events and programs including Nappy Roots Failure Free Reading Program; Prophet's Society, a non-profit organization which helps disadvantaged children; and the development of R. Prophet's Hip-Hop Multiplication CD, an educational tool used to teach children multiplication. R. Prophet also served as a motivational speaker and mentor for Kentucky, Indiana, and Texas school systems.

2007–09
In 2007, R. Prophet went on to pursue his solo career, traveling to Houston, Texas to record his first hit single, "Run Tell The DJ To Crank it" with former Cash Money producer Mannie Fresh. The single was an instant hit generating over 2500 spins (radio) after its independent release. Following the success of his hit single, R. Prophet performed on-stage with the likes of Nelly, Ludacris, T.I., Young Buck, and Yung Joc.

In 2008, R. Prophet was also featured in Hilary Duff's single "Reach Out" from her album, "Best of Hilary Duff". However, he was not officially credited for this.

2010
In 2010, R. Prophet relocated to Los Angeles, California to further pursue his solo career; producing, writing, and recording for several artists, as well as himself. In 2011, R. Prophet teamed with Hugo Ferreira of Tantric to record tracks joining rock and hip-hop.

2013
On April 20, 2013, Prophet was brutally beaten and arrested by Kentucky State Police after surviving being tased 15 times. TMZ released exclusive photos of R. Prophet badly beaten with bruises on his arms, wrists, and legs.

2015
On July 22, 2015, R. Prophet appeared on an episode of MTV's Catfish: The TV Show as the show's second celebrity client, after Broadway actress Tracie Thoms.

2016
R. Prophet developed hip-hop educational tools for children. He was also acting, recording his solo album (tentatively called "Genesis"), and writing and producing for other mainstream artists. He began independently executive producing films and television shows (e.g., "Hip Hop Boot Camp"), and ghost writing.

2019
R. Prophet signs major distribution deal with SONY music/Orchard in a joint venture with That Rabbit distribution set to release debut single "Jesse James" February 1.

Awards and honors
R. Prophet was appointed to the Board & Advisory Council of the Muhammad Ali Center.

Due to the contributions made by R. Prophet and Nappy Roots in the state of Kentucky and abroad, Governor of Kentucky, Paul E. Patton declared September 16, 2002 as "Nappy Roots Day", as well as the members of the group being officially declared "Kentucky colonels", the highest title of honor bestowed by the Commonwealth of Kentucky.

Discography

Major albums (with Nappy Roots)

Mixtapes (With Nappy Roots)

References

Inline citations

General references
 "Nappy Roots Aim To Nourish Kentucky-Style With Water-melon, Chicken & Gritz," MTV.com,  (October 31, 2003).
 
 "Nappy Roots: Bio," MTV.com, (October 31, 2003).
 "Nappy Roots Dig Deep". RollingStone.com, (October 31, 2003).
 "Nappy Roots Eat Humble Pie, Go Low-Budget For 'Po' Folks'" MTV.com (October 31, 2003).
 "Nappy Roots melds urban and country sounds". The Cincinnati Enquirer. (November 19, 2003).
 "Nappy Roots Out To Show They're Not Just Country Boys". MTV.com, (October 31, 2003).
 "Nappy Roots serve up another slice of goodness". The University of Wisconsin Badger Herald,  (November 19, 2003).
 "Muhammad Ali Board & Advisory".  (Current)
 "Kentucky Governor Declares Sept. 16th "Nappy Roots Day": Group Named Newest "Kentucky Colonels". "THE WORLD ACCORDING TO NAPPY" DVD Out This Week" Business Wire. FindArticles.com. (September 16, 2002).

Further reading
 Billboard, January 19, 2002; September 6, 2003; September 13, 2003.
 Entertainment Weekly, May 31, 2002; September 5, 2003.
 Interview, September 2003.
 Rolling Stone, October 16, 2003.
 Time, April 29, 2002.

External links
 R. Prophet's official site
 R. Prophet on Facebook
 R. Prophet on Twitter
 R. Prophet on MySpace.com
 Nappy Roots official site
 

Living people
Rappers from Oakland, California
African-American male rappers
Western Kentucky University alumni
Rappers from California
Musicians from Louisville, Kentucky
Rappers from Kentucky
DuPont Manual High School alumni
1973 births
21st-century American rappers
21st-century American male musicians
21st-century African-American musicians
20th-century African-American people